Panic in the House of Ardon (German: Der Schrecken im Hause Ardon) is a 1920 German silent crime film directed by Robert Wiene and starring Stella Harf, Max Kronert and Paul Mederow. The film was finished by August 1920, but did not have its premiere until July 1921. It also had several alternative titles including Die Welteroberer (The World Conquerors). A crime syndicate attempts to discover the scientific secrets of the chemical company Ardon. The film was made in the Expressionist style that had been used for Wiene's earlier hit The Cabinet of Dr. Caligari. It features the popular detective Stuart Webbs, closely modeled on Sherlock Holmes.

Cast
In alphabetical order
 Stella Harf   
 Max Kronert   
 Paul Mederow   
 Georg H. Schnell   
 Ernst Stahl-Nachbaur   
 Kurt von Wangenheim

References

Bibliography
 Jung, Uli & Schatzberg, Walter. Beyond Caligari: The Films of Robert Wiene. Berghahn Books, 1999.

External links

1920 films
Films of the Weimar Republic
German silent feature films
German crime films
Films directed by Robert Wiene
German Expressionist films
1920 crime films
German black-and-white films
1920s German films
1920s German-language films